Longcheng Square station is a station of Line 3, Shenzhen Metro. It is located at the east of Longcheng Middle Road. The station opened on 28 December 2010. It is an elevated station. The station is located by Tesco Shenzhen, a branch of the British supermarket.

Station layout

Exits

References

External links
 Shenzhen Metro Longcheng Square (Chinese)
 Shenzhen Metro Longcheng Square (English)

Railway stations in Guangdong
Shenzhen Metro stations
Longgang District, Shenzhen
Railway stations in China opened in 2010